("Obituary"), WAB 81a, is a song composed by Anton Bruckner in 1877 in memory of Joseph Seiberl.

History 
Bruckner composed the song on a text of Heinrich von der Mattig on 19 October 1877 in memory of his friend Joseph Seiberl, who died on 10 June 1877. The piece was performed nine days later by the Liedertafel Sängerbund in the St. Florian Abbey.

Trösterin Musik 
In 1886 Rudolf Weinwurm asked August Seuffert, editor of the Wiener Zeitung, to write another text to fit to Bruckner's Nachruf. Weinwurm performed the revised setting as Trösterin Musik with the Wiener Akademischer Gesangverein in the Musikvereinsaal on 11 April 1886. The original manuscript is lost. A copy of it is stored in the Österreichische Nationalbibliothek.

Text 

Nachruf uses a text by Heinrich von der Mattig.

Trösterin Musik 

The second setting as Trösterin Musik uses a text by August Seuffert.

Music 
The 51-bar long work in C minor is scored for  choir and organ. The first 30 bars are sung a cappella. The organ is set fortissimo (in organo pleno with pedal) on bar 31 by the text "Drum mag's im Orgelstrome brausen". The song ends a cappella pianissimo on "nun ruh' in Frieden!".

Selected discography 

In the original setting as Nachruf the organ accompaniment from bar 31 is meaningful because of the profession of the defunct. In the second setting as Trösterin Musik, the organ accompaniment can, as many performers are doing, be removed without harming the sense of the piece. The second strophe, which is a variant of the first is also often omitted.

Nachruf 

There is only one recording with the original text as Nachruf:
 Łukasz Borowicz, Anton Bruckner: Requiem, RIAS Kammerchor Berlin, Akademie für Alte Musik Berlin – CD: Accentus ACC30474, 2019 - adapted for SATB mixed choir, followed by Trösterin Musik

Trösterin Musik 

The first recording of Trösterin Musik was by Willi Schell with the Cronenberger Männerchor in 1956 – 45 rpm: Tonstudio Wolfgang Jakob (Dortmund)

A selection of the about 30 other recordings:
 Jörg-Peter Weigle,  Männerchor des Leipziger Rundfunkchores, In einem kühlen Grunde – LP: Eterna 7 35 209, 1984; reissued in CD: Delta 18 331 – a cappella
 Robert Shewan, Roberts Wesleyan College Chorale; Thaddeus James Stuart (organ), Choral Works of Anton Bruckner – CD: Albany TROY 063, 1991
 Michael Gläser, Chor des Bayerischen Rundfunks, Leise Töne der Brust – CD: Oehms Classics OC 589, 1993 – a cappella 
 Martin L. Fiala, Männergesang-Verein Sängerlust, Festkonzert – CD: EE-004CD, 1994 – 1 strophe a cappella
 Guido Mancusi, Chorus Viennensis, Walter Lochmann (organ), Musik, du himmlisches Gebilde! – CD: ORF CD 73, 1995
 Thomas Kerbl, Männerchorvereinigung Bruckner 08, Philipp Sonntag (organ), Anton Bruckner – Männerchöre – CD: LIVA027, 2008 – 1 strophe

References

Sources 
 Anton Bruckner – Sämtliche Werke, Band XXIII/2:  Weltliche Chorwerke (1843–1893), Musikwissenschaftlicher Verlag der Internationalen Bruckner-Gesellschaft, Angela Pachovsky and Anton Reinthaler (Editor), Vienna, 1989
 Cornelis van Zwol, Anton Bruckner 1824–1896 – Leven en werken, uitg. Thoth, Bussum, Netherlands, 2012. 
 Uwe Harten, Anton Bruckner. Ein Handbuch. , Salzburg, 1996. .

External links 
 
 Nachruf c-Moll, WAB 81 and Trösterin Musik c-Moll, WAB 88 – Critical discography by Hans Roelofs 
 Performances of Trösterin Musik on YouTube:
 the Wagner Society Male Choir of Japan, 11 December 1988: Trösterin Musik
 Dresdner Kreuzchor: Trösterin Musik, 24 August 2013 – 1 strophe sung a cappella
 Ensemble Amarcord : Trösterin Musik, 18 June 2015 – 1 strophe sung a cappella
 The Singing Statesmen:  Trösterin Musik, 07 May 2016 - 1 strophe with organ
 : Trösterin Musik

Weltliche Chorwerke by Anton Bruckner
1877 compositions
1886 compositions
Compositions in C minor